The women's 76 kilograms competition at the 2021 World Weightlifting Championships was held on 14 December 2021.

Schedule

Medalists

Records

Results

References

Results

Women's 76 kg
World Championships